Iona ((IPA:[ˈiːˈxaɫ̪ɯimˈçiʎə]), sometimes simply Ì) is a small island in the Inner Hebrides, off the Ross of Mull on the western coast of Scotland. It is mainly known for Iona Abbey, though there are other buildings on the island. Iona Abbey was a centre of Gaelic monasticism for three centuries and is today known for its relative tranquility and natural environment. It is a tourist destination and a place for spiritual retreats. Its modern Scottish Gaelic name means "Iona of (Saint) Columba" (formerly anglicised as "Icolmkill").

In 2019, the island's estimated population was 120. Residents engage in farming, using traditional methods. Other occupations include crofting and tourism-related work; some craftsmen make goods for sale locally, such as pottery, tapestries, jewellery and knitted goods. In March 1980, the Hugh Fraser Foundation donated much of the main island (and its off-lying islands) to the current owner, the National Trust for Scotland. The abbey and some church buildings are owned by the Iona Cathedral Trust.

One publication, describing the religious significance of the island, says that the island is "known as the birthplace of Celtic Christianity in Scotland,” and notes that “St Columba came here in the year 563 to establish the Abbey, which still stands".

Etymology
Because the Hebrides have been successively occupied by speakers of several languages since the Iron Age, many of its islands’ names have more than one possible meaning. Nonetheless, few, if any, have accumulated as many different names over the centuries as the island now known in English as "Iona".

The place-name scholar William J. Watson has shown that the earliest recorded names of the island meant something like "yew-place". The element Ivo-, denoting "yew", occurs in inscriptions in the ogham alphabet (Iva-cattos [genitive], Iva-geni [genitive]) and in Gaulish names (Ivo-rix, Ivo-magus); it may also be the basis of early Gaelic names like Eógan (ogham: Ivo-genos). The island's name may also be related to the name of a mythological figure, Fer hÍ mac Eogabail, the foster-son of Manannan, whose forename meaning "man of the yew".

Mac an Tàilleir (2003) has analyzed  the more recent Gaelic names of Ì, Ì Chaluim Chille and Eilean Idhe. He notes that the name Ì was "generally lengthened to avoid confusion" with Ì Chaluim Chille, which means "Calum's Iona" or "island of Calum's monastery". (“Calum”’s Latinized form is "Columba".) This confusion would have arisen because ì, the original name of the island, would have been confused with the now-obsolete Gaelic noun ì, meaning "island", which was derived from the Old Norse word for island (ey). Eilean Idhe means "the isle of Iona", also known as Ì nam ban bòidheach ("the isle of beautiful women"). The modern English name comes from yet another variant, Ioua, which arose either from Adomnán's 7th-century attempt to make the Gaelic name fit Latin grammar, or spontaneously, as a derivative of  Ivova ("yew place"). The change in the island's name from Ioua to Iona, which is attested from c.1274, resulted from a transcription error due to the similarity of "n" and "u" in Insular Minuscule script.

Despite the continuity of forms in Gaelic from the pre-Norse to the post-Norse era, Haswell-Smith (2004) speculates that the island’s name may be connected with the Norse word Hiōe, meaning "island of the den of the brown bear". The medieval English-language version of the name was "Icolmkill" (and variants thereof).

Folk etymology
Murray (1966) claims that the "ancient" Gaelic name was Innis nan Druinich ("the isle of Druidic hermits"), but there is no evidence for the "ancient" use of such a name before the twentieth century, and it probably arises from a misunderstanding of the name Cladh nan Druineach, which means 'burial ground of the embroideresses or artificers' - a cemetery on the east shore of the island.  He also repeats a Gaelic story (which he admits is apocryphal) that as Columba's coracle first drew close to the island one of his companions cried out "Chì mi i" meaning "I see her" and that Columba's response was "Henceforth we shall call her Ì".

 Geology 
The geology of Iona is quite complex given the island's size and quite distinct from that of nearby Mull. About half of the island's bedrock is Scourian gneiss assigned to the Lewisian complex and dating from the Archaean eon making it some of the oldest rock in Britain and indeed Europe. Closely associated with these gneisses are mylonite and meta-anorthosite and melagabbro. Along the eastern coast facing Mull are steeply dipping Neoproterozoic age metaconglomerates, metasandstones, metamudstones and hornfelsed metasiltstones ascribed to the Iona Group, described traditionally as Torridonian. In the southwest and on parts of the west coast are pelites and semipelites of Archaean to Proterozoic age. There are small outcrops of Silurian age pink granite on southeastern beaches, similar to those of the Ross of Mull pluton cross the sound to the east. Numerous geological faults cross the island, many in a E-W or NW-SE alignment. Devonian aged microdiorite dykes are found in places and some of these are themselves cut by Palaeocene age camptonite and monchiquite dykes ascribed to the 'Iona-Ross of Mull dyke swarm’.  More recent sedimentary deposits of Quaternary age include both present day beach deposits and raised marine deposits around Iona as well as some restricted areas of blown sand.

Geography

Like other places swept by ocean breezes, there are few trees; most of them are near the parish church.

Iona's highest point is Dùn Ì, an Iron Age hill fort dating from 100 BC – AD 200. Iona's geographical features include the Bay at the Back of the Ocean and Càrn Cùl ri Éirinn (the Hill/Cairn of [turning the] Back to Ireland), said to be adjacent to the beach where St. Columba first landed.

The main settlement, located at St. Ronan's Bay on the eastern side of the island, is called Baile Mòr and is also known locally as "The Village". The primary school, post office, the island's two hotels, the Bishop's House and the ruins of the Nunnery are here. The Abbey and MacLeod Centre are a short walk to the north.Murray (1966) pp. 82–83. Port Bàn (white port) beach on the west side of the island is home to the Iona Beach Party.

There are numerous offshore islets and skerries: Eilean Annraidh (island of storm) and Eilean Chalbha (calf island) to the north, Rèidh Eilean and Stac MhicMhurchaidh to the west and Eilean Mùsimul (mouse holm island) and Soa Island to the south are amongst the largest. The steamer Cathcart Park carrying a cargo of salt from Runcorn to Wick ran aground on Soa on 15 April 1912, the crew of 11 escaping in two boats.The record is tentative, the press cutting the record refers to identifying "'Sheep Island', one of the Torran Rocks near Iona" but there is no other obvious contender.

Subdivision
On a map of 1874, the following territorial subdivision is indicated (from north to south):
Ceann Tsear (East Head)
Sliabh Meanach (Middle Mountain)
Machar (Low-lying Grassy Plain)
Sliginach (Shelly Area)
Sliabh Siar (Rear Mountain)
Staonaig (Sloping Ground)

History

Dál Riata

In the early Historic Period Iona lay within the Gaelic kingdom of Dál Riata, in the region controlled by the Cenél Loairn (i.e. Lorn, as it was then). The island was the site of a highly important monastery (see Iona Abbey) during the Early Middle Ages. The monastery was founded in 563 by the monk Columba, also known as Colm Cille, who sailed here from Ireland to live the monastic life.  Much later legends (a thousand years later, and without any good evidence) said that he had been exiled from his native Ireland as a result of his involvement in the Battle of Cul Dreimhne. Columba and twelve companions went into exile on Iona and founded a monastery there. The monastery was hugely successful, and may have played a role in the conversion to Christianity of the Picts and Gaels of present-day Scotland in the late 6th century, and was certainly central to the conversion of the Anglo-Saxon kingdom of Northumbria in 635. Many satellite institutions were founded, and Iona became the centre of one of the most important monastic systems in Great Britain and Ireland.

Iona became a renowned centre of learning, and its scriptorium produced highly important documents, probably including the original texts of the Iona Chronicle, thought to be the source for the early Irish annals. The monastery is often associated with the distinctive practices and traditions known as Celtic Christianity. In particular, Iona was a major supporter of the "Celtic" system for calculating the date of Easter at the time of the Easter controversy, which pitted supporters of the Celtic system against those favoring the "Roman" system used elsewhere in Western Christianity. The controversy weakened Iona's ties to Northumbria, which adopted the Roman system at the Synod of Whitby in 664, and to Pictland, which followed suit in the early 8th century. Iona itself did not adopt the Roman system until 715, according to the Anglo-Saxon historian Bede. Iona's prominence was further diminished over the next centuries as a result of Viking raids and the rise of other powerful monasteries in the system, such as the Abbey of Kells.

The Book of Kells may have been produced or begun on Iona towards the end of the 8th century.Forbes, Andrew ; Henley, David (2012). Pages from the Book of Kells. Chiang Mai: Cognoscenti Books. ASIN: B00AN4JVI0 Around this time the island's exemplary high crosses were sculpted; these may be the first such crosses to contain the ring around the intersection that became characteristic of the "Celtic cross". The series of Viking raids on Iona began in 794 and, after its treasures had been plundered many times, Columba's relics were removed and divided two ways between Scotland and Ireland in 849 as the monastery was abandoned.

Kingdom of the Isles
As the Norse domination of the west coast of Scotland advanced, Iona became part of the Kingdom of the Isles. The Norse  Rex plurimarum insularum Amlaíb Cuarán died in 980 or 981 whilst in "religious retirement" on Iona.Gregory (1881) pp. 4–6 Nonetheless, the island was sacked twice by his successors, on Christmas night 986 and again in 987. Although Iona was never again important to Ireland, it rose to prominence once more in Scotland following the establishment of the Kingdom of Scotland in the later 9th century; the ruling dynasty of Scotland traced its origin to Iona, and the island thus became an important spiritual centre for the new kingdom, with many of its early kings buried there. However, a campaign by Magnus Barelegs led to the formal acknowledgement of Norwegian control of Argyll, in 1098.

Somerled, the brother-in-law of Norway's governor of the region (the King of the Isles), launched a revolt, and made the kingdom independent. A convent for Augustinian nuns was established in about 1208, with Bethóc, Somerled's daughter, as first prioress. The present buildings are of the Benedictine abbey, Iona Abbey, from about 1203, dissolved at the Reformation.

On Somerled's death, nominal Norwegian overlordship of the Kingdom was re-established, but de facto control was split between Somerled's sons, and his brother-in-law.

Kingdom of Scotland

Following the 1266 Treaty of Perth the Hebrides were transferred from Norwegian to Scottish overlordship. At the end of the century, King John Balliol was challenged for the throne by Robert the Bruce. By this point, Somerled's descendants had split into three groups, the MacRory, MacDougalls, and MacDonalds. The MacDougalls backed Balliol, so when he was defeated by de Bruys, the latter exiled the MacDougalls and transferred their island territories to the MacDonalds; by marrying the heir of the MacRorys, the heir of the MacDonalds re-unified most of Somerled's realm, creating the Lordship of the Isles, under nominal Scottish authority. Iona, which had been a MacDougall territory (together with the rest of Lorn), was given to the Campbells, where it remained for half a century.

In 1354, though in exile and without control of his ancestral lands, John, the MacDougall heir, quitclaimed any rights he had over Mull and Iona to the Lord of the Isles (though this had no meaningful effect at the time). When Robert's son, David II, became king, he spent some time in English captivity; following his release, in 1357, he restored MacDougall authority over Lorn. The 1354 quitclaim, which seems to have been an attempt to ensure peace in just such an eventuality, took automatic effect, splitting Mull and Iona from Lorn, and making it subject to the Lordship of the Isles. Iona remained part of the Lordship of the Isles for the next century and a half.

Following the 1491 Raid on Ross, the Lordship of the Isles was dismantled, and Scotland gained full control of Iona for the second time. The monastery and nunnery continued to be active until the Reformation, when buildings were demolished and all but three of the 360 carved crosses destroyed. The Augustine nunnery now only survives as a number of 13th century ruins, including a church and cloister. By the 1760s little more of the nunnery remained standing than at present, though it is the most complete remnant of a medieval nunnery in Scotland.

Post-Union

After a visit in 1773, the English writer Samuel Johnson remarked:

The island, which was once the metropolis of learning and piety, now has no school for education, nor temple for worship.

He estimated the population of the village at 70 families or perhaps 350 inhabitants.

In the 19th century green-streaked marble was commercially mined in the south-east of Iona; the quarry and machinery survive, see 'Marble Quarry remains' below.

Iona Abbey

Iona Abbey, now an ecumenical church, is of particular historical and religious interest to pilgrims and visitors alike. It is the most elaborate and best-preserved ecclesiastical building surviving from the Middle Ages in the Western Isles of Scotland.  Though modest in scale in comparison to medieval abbeys elsewhere in Western Europe, it has a wealth of fine architectural detail, and monuments of many periods. The 8th Duke of Argyll presented the sacred buildings and sites of the island to the Iona Cathedral trust in 1899. Historic Environment Scotland also recommends visiting the Augustinian nunnery, "the most complete nunnery complex to survive in Scotland". It was founded at the same time as the Abbey; many ruins from the 14th century are visible. The nunnery declined after the Scottish Reformation but was still used as a burial place for women.  

In front of the Abbey stands the 9th-century St Martin's Cross, one of the best-preserved Celtic crosses in the British Isles, and a replica of the 8th-century St John's Cross (original fragments in the Abbey museum).

The ancient burial ground, called the Rèilig Odhrain (Eng: Oran's "burial place" or "cemetery"), contains the 12th-century chapel of St Odhrán (said to be Columba's uncle), restored at the same time as the Abbey itself. It contains a number of medieval grave monuments. The abbey graveyard is said to contain the graves of many early Scottish Kings, as well as Norse kings from Ireland and Norway. Iona became the burial site for the kings of Dál Riata and their successors. Notable burials there include:

Cináed mac Ailpín, king of the Picts (also known today as "Kenneth I of Scotland")
Domnall mac Causantín, alternatively "king of the Picts" or "king of Scotland" ("Donald II")
Máel Coluim mac Domnaill, king of Scotland ("Malcolm I")
Donnchad mac Crínáin, king of Scotland ("Duncan I")
Mac Bethad mac Findlaích, king of Scotland ("Macbeth")
Domnall mac Donnchada, king of Scotland ("Donald III")
John Smith, Labour Party Leader

In 1549 an inventory of 48 Scottish, 8 Norwegian and 4 Irish kings was recorded. None of these graves are now identifiable (their inscriptions were reported to have worn away at the end of the 17th century). Saint Baithin and Saint Failbhe may also be buried on the island. The Abbey graveyard is also the final resting place of John Smith, the former Labour Party leader, who loved Iona. His grave is marked with an epitaph quoting Alexander Pope: "An honest man's the noblest work of God".

Limited archaeological investigations commissioned by the National Trust for Scotland found some evidence for ancient burials in 2013. The excavations, conducted in the area of Martyrs Bay, revealed burials from the 6th–8th centuries, probably jumbled up and reburied in the 13–15th centuries.

Other early Christian and medieval monuments have been removed for preservation to the cloister arcade of the Abbey, and the Abbey museum (in the medieval infirmary). The ancient buildings of Iona Abbey are now cared for by Historic Environment Scotland (there is an entrance charge to visit them).

Marble quarry remains

The remains of a marble quarrying enterprise can be seen in a small bay on the south-east shore of Iona. The quarry is the source of 'Iona Marble', a beautiful translucent green and white stone, much used in brooches and other jewellery. The stone has been known of for centuries and was credited with healing and other powers. While the quarry had been used in a small way, it was not until around the end of the 18th century when it was opened up on a more industrial scale by the Duke of Argyle. The then difficulties of extracting the hard stone and transporting it meant that the scheme was short lived. Another attempt was started in 1907, this time more successful with considerable quantities of stone extracted and indeed exported, but the First World War put paid to this as well, with little quarrying after 1914 and the operation finally closing in 1919. A painting showing the quarry in operation, The Marble Quarry, Iona (1909) by David Young Cameron, is in the collection of Cartwright Hall art gallery in Bradford. Such is the site's rarity that it has been designated as a Scheduled Ancient Monument.

Present day
The island, other than the land owned by the Iona Cathedral Trust, was purchased from the Duke of Argyll by Hugh Fraser in 1979 and donated to the National Trust for Scotland. In 2001 Iona's population was 125 and by the time of the 2011 census this had grown to 177 usual residents. During the same period Scottish island populations as a whole grew by 4% to 103,702. The estimated permanent population in 2020 was 120. 

The island's tourism bureau estimated that roughly 130,000 visitors arrived each year. Many tourists come to visit the Abbey and other ecclesiastical properties and the marble quarry, or to enjoy the nine beaches that are within walking distance of the main area.

Iona Community

Not to be confused with the local island community, Iona (Abbey) Community is based within Iona Abbey.

In 1938 George MacLeod founded the Iona Community, an ecumenical Christian community of men and women from different walks of life and different traditions in the Christian church committed to seeking new ways of living the Gospel of Jesus in today's world. This community is a leading force in the present Celtic Christian revival.

The Iona Community runs three residential centres on the Isle of Iona and on Mull, where one can live together in community with people of every background from all over the world. Weeks at the centres often follow a programme related to the concerns of the Iona Community.

The 8 tonne Fallen Christ sculpture by Ronald Rae was permanently situated outside the MacLeod Centre in February 2008.

Transport
Visitors can reach Iona by the 10-minute ferry trip across the Sound of Iona from Fionnphort on Mull. The most common route from the mainland is via Oban in Argyll and Bute, where regular ferries connect to Craignure on Mull, from where the scenic road runs  to Fionnphort. Tourist coaches and local bus services meet the ferries.

Car ownership is lightly regulated, with no requirement for a MOT Certificate or payment of Road Tax for cars kept permanently on the island, but vehicular access is restricted to permanent residents and there are few cars. Visitors are not allowed to bring vehicles onto the island although "blue badge holders with restricted mobility ... may apply for a permit under certain exemptions". Visitors will find the village, the shops, the post office, the cafe, the hotels and the abbey are all within walking distance. Bike hire is available at the pier, and on Mull. Taxi service is also available.

Tourism
Conde Nast Traveller recommends the island for its "peaceful atmosphere ... a popular place for spiritual retreats" but also recommends the "sandy beaches, cliffs, rocks, fields and bogs ... "wildflowers and birds such as the rare corncrake and puffins" as well as the "abundance of sea life".

The Iona Council advises visitors that they can find a campsite (at Cnoc Oran), a hostel (at Lagandorain), family run bed and breakfasts, and two hotels on the island in addition to several self-catering houses. The agency also mentions that distances are short, with the Abbey a mere 10 minutes’ walk from the pier. Tourists can rent bikes or use the local taxi. 

 Iona in Scottish painting 
The island of Iona has played an important role in Scottish landscape painting, especially during the Twentieth Century. As travel to north and west Scotland became easier from the mid C18 on, artists' visits to the island steadily increased. The Abbey remains in particular became frequently recorded during this early period. Many of the artists are listed and illustrated in the valuable book, Iona Portrayed – The Island through Artists' Eyes 1760–1960''', which lists over 170 artists known to have painted on the island.

The C20 however saw the greatest period of influence on landscape painting, in particular through the many paintings of the island produced by F C B Cadell and S J Peploe, two of the ‘Scottish Colourists’. As with many artists, both professional and amateur, they were attracted by the unique quality of light, the white sandy beaches, the aquamarine colours of the sea and the landscape of rich greens and rocky outcrops. While Cadell and Peploe are perhaps best known, many major Scottish painters of the C20 worked on Iona and visited many times – for example George Houston, D Y Cameron, James Shearer, John Duncan and John Maclauchlan Milne, among many.

Media and the arts
Samuel Johnson wrote "That man is little to be envied whose patriotism would not gain force upon the plains of Marathon, or whose piety would not grow warmer amid the ruins of Iona."

In Jules Verne's novel The Green Ray, the heroes visit Iona in chapters 13 to 16. The inspiration is romantic, the ruins of the island are conducive to daydreaming. The young heroine, Helena Campbell, argues that Scotland in general and Iona in particular are the scene of the appearance of goblins and other familiar demons.

In Jean Raspail's novel The Fisherman's Ring (1995), his cardinal is one of the last to support the antipope Benedict XIII and his successors.

In the novel The Carved Stone (by Guillaume Prévost), the young Samuel Faulkner is projected in time as he searches for his father and lands on Iona in the year 800, then threatened by the Vikings.

"Peace of Iona" is a song written by Mike Scott that appears on the studio album Universal Hall and on the live recording Karma to Burn by The Waterboys. Iona is the setting for the song "Oran" on the 1997 Steve McDonald album Stone of Destiny.

Kenneth C. Steven published an anthology of poetry entitled Iona: Poems in 2000 inspired by his association with the island and the surrounding area.

Iona is featured prominently in the first episode ("By the Skin of Our Teeth") of the celebrated arts series Civilisation: A Personal View by Kenneth Clark (1969).

Iona is the setting of Jeanne M. Dams' Dorothy Martin mystery Holy Terror of the Hebrides (1998).

The Academy Award–nominated Irish animated film The Secret of Kells is about the creation of the Book of Kells. One of the characters, Brother Aidan, is a master illuminator from Iona Abbey who had helped to illustrate the Book, but had to escape the island with it during a Viking invasion.

Frances Macdonald the contemporary Scottish artist based in Crinian, Argyll, regularly paints landscapes on Iona.

Neil Gaiman's poem "In Relig Odhrain", published in Trigger Warning: Short Fictions and Disturbances (2015), retells the story of Oran's death, and the creation of the chapel on Iona.  This poem was made into a short stop-motion animated film, released in 2019.

Gallery

See also

 List of islands of Scotland
 Bishop's House Iona
 Clann-an-oistir
 Dál Riata
 Statutes of Iona

Footnotes

References

Sources
 Christian, J  &  Stiller, C (2000), Iona Portrayed – The Island through Artists' Eyes 1760–1960, The New Iona Press, Inverness, 96pp, numerous illustrations in B&W and colour, with list of artists.
Dwelly, Edward (1911). Faclair Gàidhlig gu Beurla le Dealbhan/The Illustrated [Scottish] Gaelic- English Dictionary. Edinburgh. Birlinn. .
 
 Gregory, Donald (1881) The History of the Western Highlands and Isles of Scotland 1493–1625. Edinburgh. Birlinn. 2008 reprint – originally published by Thomas D. Morrison. .
 
 Hunter, James (2000). Last of the Free: A History of the Highlands and Islands of Scotland. Edinburgh. Mainstream. 
 Johnson, Samuel (1775). A Journey to the Western Islands of Scotland. London: Chapman & Dodd. (1924 edition).
 
 
 Marsden, John (1995). The Illustrated Life of Columba. Edinburgh. Floris Books. .
 Murray, W. H. (1966). The Hebrides. London. Heinemann.
 Ó Corráin, Donnchadh (1998) Vikings in Ireland and Scotland in the Ninth Century CELT.
 Watson, W. J., The History of the Celtic Place-names of Scotland. Reprinted with an introduction by Simon Taylor, Birlinn, Edinburgh, 2004. .
 

Citations

Further reading
 Campbell, George F. (2006). The First and Lost Iona. Glasgow: Candlemas Hill Publishing.  (and on Kindle).
 Herbert, Maire (1996). Iona, Kells and Derry: The History and Hagiography of the Monastic familia of Columba. Dublin: Four Courts Press.
 MacArthur, E Mairi, Iona, Colin Baxter Island Guide'' (1997) Colin Baxter Photography, Grantown-on-Spey, 128pp.

External links

 Visit Mull & Iona (Official tourism website for the Isles of Mull and Iona)
Isle of Iona, Scotland (A visitors guide to the Isle)
The Iona Community
 Computer-generated virtual panorama Summit of Iona Index

Photo Gallery of Iona by Enrico Martino
 National Trust for Scotland property page

 
Burial sites of the Crovan dynasty
Burial sites of the Royal House of Northumbria
Insular art
Extinct volcanoes
National Trust for Scotland properties
Paleogene volcanism
Volcanoes of Scotland
Islands of Argyll and Bute
Islands of the Inner Hebrides